Dayo Oyewusi (born c. 1966) is a Nigerian badminton player. She competed in 1994 Commonwealth Games in Victoria, Canada. She won the 1991 Kenya International tournament in the women's doubles event partnered with Obiageli Olorunsola.

Achievements

IBF International 
Women's singles

Women's doubles

Mixed doubles

References

External links 
 
 

1966 births
Living people
Nigerian female badminton players
Badminton players at the 1994 Commonwealth Games
Commonwealth Games competitors for Nigeria
Yoruba sportswomen
20th-century Nigerian women